Good Music is the fifth studio album by Joan Jett and the Blackhearts, released in 1986. The album's working title was Contact, after the final song off the album (hence the contact sheet of photographs on the cover), but it was changed to Good Music in its final stages.

"Fantasy" was also recorded for this album but was instead featured as the non-LP B-side to the "Good Music" single, which peaked at #83 on the Billboard Hot 100. It also appeared on Jett's odds-and-sods album, Flashback.

The song "This Means War" also appeared on the concurrently released soundtrack to Joan Jett's debut movie, Light of Day.

A video was shot for the shortened single mix of "Good Music", following Joan Jett around New York City. Jett is seen in her limo throwing 'bad music' tapes out the window, as well as playing guitar in her loft and even washing her hair in the shower. It climaxed with an in-concert appearance with her band at CBGB, however the video was rarely played on MTV.

Track listing

Personnel

The Blackhearts
Joan Jett - lead vocals, rhythm guitar
Ricky Byrd - lead guitar, backing vocals
Gary Ryan - bass, backing vocals
Lee Crystal - drums
Kasim Sulton - bass, backing vocals
Thommy Price - drums

Additional musicians
Bob Halligan, Jr. - guitar, piano, backing vocals
Reggie Griffin - guitar, bass, drums
Rick Knowles - guitar
Michael Rudetsky, Ronnie Lawson - keyboards
Dennis Feldman - bass
Jimmy Bralower - drums
Ross Levinson - violin
Bashiri Johnson, Nelson Williams, Thom Panunzio, Larry Smith - percussion
Darlene Love - backing vocals and vocal arrangements
Carl Wilson, Al Jardine, Bruce Johnston, Mike Love, Billy Hinsche, Bobby Figueroa - backing vocals on “Good Music”
Kenny Laguna - various instruments and backing vocals
The Uptown Horns:
Crispin Choe - baritone saxophone
Robert Funk - trombone
Arno Hecht - tenor saxophone
Paul Litteral - trumpet

Production
Kenny Laguna - producer on all tracks
Thom Panunzio - producer on all tracks, engineer, mixing
Mark S. Berry - producer on tracks 4 and 9
Larry Smith, Reggie Griffin - producers on track 6 
John Aiosa - associate producer, additional engineering
Tom Swift, Gray Russell, Jim Ball - additional engineering
Bob Ludwig - mastering at Masterdisk, New York

Charts

References

Joan Jett albums
1986 albums
Blackheart Records albums
Polydor Records albums
Columbia Records albums
Albums produced by Thom Panunzio